Rockingham County is a county in the U.S. state of New Hampshire. At the 2020 census, the population was 314,176, making it New Hampshire's second-most populous county. The county seat is Brentwood. Rockingham County is part of the Boston-Cambridge-Newton, MA-NH Metropolitan Statistical Area and the greater Boston-Worcester-Providence, MA-RI-NH-CT Combined Statistical Area. Per the 2020 census, it was New Hampshire's fastest growing county from 2010 to 2020.

As of 2014-2018 estimates from the American Community Survey, Rockingham County was the 4th wealthiest county in New England, with a median household income of $90,429.

History
The area that today is Rockingham County was first settled by Europeans moving north from the Plymouth Colony in Massachusetts as early as 1623. The government was linked tightly with Massachusetts until New Hampshire became a separate colony in 1679, but counties were not introduced until 1769.

Rockingham was identified in 1769 as one of five original counties for the colony. It is named for Charles Watson-Wentworth, 2nd Marquess of Rockingham, who had been Prime Minister from 1765 to 1766. The county was organized in 1771, with its county seat at Exeter. In 1823, a portion of Hillsborough Country became part of the formation of Merrimack County. In 1844, its area was further reduced by the formation of Belknap County to the northwest. In 1997, the county court facilities were moved to Brentwood, a rural town adjacent to Exeter.

Geography
The county occupies the southeastern corner of the state of New Hampshire, and it contains the state's easternmost point.

Adjacent counties
 Strafford County (north)
 York County, Maine (northeast)
 Essex County, Massachusetts (south)
 Hillsborough County (west)
 Merrimack County (northwest)

National protected area
 Great Bay National Wildlife Refuge

Demographics

2000 census
As of the census of 2000, there were 277,359 people, 104,529 households, and 74,320 families living in the county. There were 113,023 housing units at an average density of 163 per square mile (63/km2). The racial makeup of the county was 96.80% White, 0.58% Black or African American, 0.18% Native American, 1.11% Asian, 0.04% Pacific Islander, 0.38% from other races, and 0.92% from two or more races.  1.19% of the population were Hispanic or Latino of any race. 18.1% were of Irish, 14.6% English, 11.8% Italian, 10.5% French, 8.0% French Canadian, 6.0% German and 5.6% American ancestry. 94.3% spoke English, 1.8% French and 1.3% Spanish as their first language.

There were 104,529 households, out of which 35.90% had children under the age of 18 living with them, 59.50% were married couples living together, 8.20% had a female householder with no husband present, and 28.90% were non-families. 22.00% of all households were made up of individuals, and 7.00% had someone living alone who was 65 years of age or older. The average household size was 2.63 and the average family size was 3.11.

In the county, the population was spread out, with 26.40% under the age of 18, 6.20% from 18 to 24, 32.80% from 25 to 44, 24.40% from 45 to 64, and 10.10% who were 65 years of age or older. The median age was 37 years. For every 100 females, there were 97.40 males. For every 100 females age 18 and over, there were 95.40 males.

The median income for a household in the county was $58,150, and the median income for a family was $66,345. (These figures had risen to $72,600 and $85,361 respectively, as of a 2007 estimate.) Males had a median income of $45,598 versus $30,741 for females. The per capita income for the county was $26,656. About 3.10% of families and 4.50% of the population were below the poverty line, including 5.00% of those under age 18 and 6.40% of those age 65 or over.

2010 census
As of the 2010 United States Census, there were 295,223 people, 115,033 households, and 79,832 families living in the county. The racial makeup of the county was 95.5% white, 1.7% Asian, 0.7% black or African American, 0.2% American Indian, 0.6% from other races, and 1.4% from two or more races. Those of Hispanic or Latino origin made up 2.1% of the population. In terms of ancestry, 26.9% were Irish, 19.0% were English, 14.8% were Italian, 9.7% were German, 7.3% were French Canadian, 5.6% were Polish, and 3.8% were American.

Of the 115,033 households, 32.9% had children under the age of 18 living with them, 56.4% were married couples living together, 8.9% had a female householder with no husband present, 30.6% were non-families, and 23.5% of all households were made up of individuals. The average household size was 2.54 and the average family size was 3.03. The median age was 42.2 years.

The median income for a household in the county was $75,825 and the median income for a family was $90,463. Males had a median income of $61,443 versus $42,478 for females. The per capita income for the county was $35,889. About 3.0% of families and 4.7% of the population were below the poverty line, including 4.9% of those under age 18 and 6.0% of those age 65 or over.

Politics and government
Rockingham County has historically been a Republican stronghold, but the county is now competitive. Three Democratic presidential nominees have won it since 1964, including Joe Biden in 2020, who was the first to win a majority since Lyndon B. Johnson.

The county is divided between the Democratic stronghold that is the Seacoast Region, and the conservative western portions of the county.

Rockingham County is one of only thirteen counties to have voted for Obama in 2008, Romney in 2012, Trump in 2016, and Biden in 2020.

|}

County Commission
The executive power of Rockingham County's government is held by three county commissioners, each representing one of the three commissioner districts within the county.

In addition to the County Commission, there are five directly elected officials: they include County Attorney, Register of Deeds, County Sheriff, Register of Probate, and County Treasurer.

Legislative branch
The legislative branch of Rockingham County is made up of the members of the New Hampshire House of Representatives from the county. In total, as of August 2018 there are 90 members from 37 different districts.

After redistricting based on the 2010 United States Census, Rockingham County was split between 8 state senate districts:

Attractions
Strawbery Banke Museum in Portsmouth is a collection of historic buildings from the 17th through 19th centuries. Canobie Lake Park, in Salem, is an amusement park that opened in 1902. Rockingham Park racetrack, which featured weekly horse racing until 2009, was also in Salem. The site of the former track, next to the Mall at Rockingham Park, is being redeveloped as Tuscan Village, a mixed-use development. America's Stonehenge, which claims to be a pre-Columbian collection of stone structures, is in northern Salem. Derry was home to poet Robert Frost, who taught at nearby Pinkerton Academy. His home, the Robert Frost Farm, has been preserved as a state park.

Rockingham County is also home to New Hampshire's entire seacoast and features several popular resort towns. Hampton Beach has a boardwalk and Hampton Beach Casino Ballroom. Rye features several undeveloped beaches such as Odiorne Point State Park and contains New Hampshire's portion of the Isles of Shoals. Seabrook contains Seabrook Greyhound Park and the Seabrook Nuclear Power Plant, the last nuclear plant opened in the United States.

Communities

City
 Portsmouth

Towns

 Atkinson
 Auburn
 Brentwood (county seat)
 Candia
 Chester
 Danville
 Deerfield
 Derry
 East Kingston
 Epping
 Exeter
 Fremont
 Greenland
 Hampstead
 Hampton
 Hampton Falls
 Kensington
 Kingston
 Londonderry
 New Castle
 Newfields
 Newington
 Newmarket
 Newton
 North Hampton
 Northwood
 Nottingham
 Plaistow
 Raymond
 Rye
 Salem
 Sandown
 Seabrook
 South Hampton
 Stratham
 Windham

Census-designated places

 Derry
 Epping
 Exeter
 Hampton
 Hampton Beach
 Londonderry
 Newfields
 Newmarket
 Raymond
 Seabrook Beach

Villages
 Candia Four Corners
 East Candia
 East Derry
 East Hampstead
 Newton Junction
 North Salem
 West Nottingham

Education
School districts include:

 K-12 districts

 Epping School District
 Londonderry School District
 Newmarket School District
 Portsmouth School District
 Raymond School District
 Salem School District
 Sanborn Regional School District
 Timberlane Regional School District
 Windham School District

 Secondary districts
 Exeter Regional Cooperative School District
 Winnacunnet Cooperative School District

 Elementary districts

 Auburn School District
 Brentwood School District
 Candia School District
 Chester School District
 Deerfield School District
 Derry School District
 East Kingston School District
 Exeter School District
 Fremont School District
 Greenland School District
 Hampstead School District
 Hampton School District
 Hampton Falls School District
 Kensington School District
 New Castle School District
 Newfields School District
 Newington School District
 North Hampton School District
 Northwood School District
 Nottingham School District
 Rye School District
 Seabrook School District
 South Hampton School District
 Stratham School District

There is also a privately-endowed, publicly-funded school, Pinkerton Academy in Derry. Towns in Rockingham County that send their public high school students to Pinkerton, other than Derry, include: Auburn, Candia, Chester, and Hampstead. Prior to 1978 Londonderry sent its high schoolers to Pinkerton. Previously Auburn and Candia sent high school students to the Manchester School District.

Notable people
 
 
Robert W. Wiley (born 1963), politician

See also
 National Register of Historic Places listings in Rockingham County, New Hampshire

Notes

References

Further reading
 D. Hamilton Hurd, History of Rockingham and Strafford Counties, New Hampshire: With Biographical Sketches of Many of Its Pioneers and Prominent Men. Philadelphia: J.W. Lewis, 1882.

External links

 Rockingham County official website

 
Counties in Greater Boston
1769 establishments in New Hampshire
Populated places established in 1769